Charles Read (c.1825 – 3 March 1910) was a tailor and politician in colonial Australia, a member of the Victorian Legislative Assembly.

Read was born in Southampton, England, the son of James Read  and Ann, nee Lye. Read arrived in Geelong in October 1849 aboard the Tasman and started business as a tailor. He was involved in the Temperance Society, "with a striking personality, a vigorous platform speaker, he soon began to render splendid service to the organisation". Read was elected as one of the three representatives for Geelong in the Victorian Legislative Assembly in 1856. Read finished third in the field of seven. He was deputy registrar of births etc. at Geelong from 1870 to 1884.

References

 

1814 births
1910 deaths
Members of the Victorian Legislative Assembly
People from Southampton
Australian tailors
English emigrants to colonial Australia